The Canada Women's Sevens is an annual women's rugby sevens tournament, and one of the stops on the World Rugby Women's Sevens Series. Canada joined in the third year of the Series. The tournament is hosted at Westhills Stadium in the Victoria suburb of Langford, British Columbia.

Results 
By placing
Summary of top-4 placings at the Canada Women's Sevens on the World Rugby Sevens Series (updated to 2022):

Results by year

Key:Blue border on the left indicates tournaments in the World Rugby Sevens Series.

See also
 Canada Sevens (for men's teams)

References

External links
 Canada Women's Sevens official website

 
World Rugby Women's Sevens Series tournaments
International women's rugby union competitions hosted by Canada
Rugby union in British Columbia
Recurring sporting events established in 2015
2015 establishments in British Columbia